Olujimi James Ayodele Olayinka  (born 5 October 2000) is an English professional footballer who plays as a midfielder for Cheltenham Town.

Career

Arsenal 
Olayinka began his career with Arsenal. He signed his first professional contract with the club in January 2019.

On 29 August 2020, Olayinka was named an unused substitute in the 2020 FA Community Shield, with Arsenal clinching a 5–4 victory over Liverpool in the penalty shootout after the match finished 1–1 after 90 minutes.

Loan to Northampton Town 
In January 2020, Olayinka moved on loan to League Two side Northampton Town until the end of the season, making his debut in a 3–0 win over Scunthorpe United on 28 January.  He helped Northampton Town to secure promotion to League One by winning the play-off final.

Loan to Southend United 
In October 2020 he joined Southend United on loan until January 2021. He scored his first goal for the club, and his first professional goal, in an FA Cup tie against Boreham Wood on 7 November 2020. On 1 February 2021, Olayinka extended his loan with Southend United to the end of the 2020–21 season.

Cheltenham Town
He signed a two-year contract with Cheltenham Town on 1 September 2022.

Career statistics

Honours
Northampton Town
EFL League Two play-offs: 2020

Arsenal
FA Community Shield: 2020

Personal life
Olayinka is of Nigerian descent.

References

2000 births
Living people
Footballers from Lambeth
English footballers
Association football midfielders
Arsenal F.C. players
Northampton Town F.C. players
Southend United F.C. players
English Football League players
Black British sportsmen
English sportspeople of Nigerian descent
Cheltenham Town F.C. players